The Serbian women's national under-16 and under-17 basketball team represents Serbia in international basketball matches and is controlled by the Basketball Federation of Serbia, the governing body for basketball in Serbia.

FIBA Europe Under-16 Championship for Women

FIBA Under-17 World Championship for Women

Previous squads
 1999 European Championship — 2nd place
Jelena Spirić, Andrea Stojanović, Biljana Pešović, Marina Mandić, Kristina Anđelković, Vanja Peričin, Maja Ranisavljev, Ivana Matović, Iva Perovanović, Milica Beljanski, Dara Kovačević, Jelena Radmilović. Head coach: Zoran Višić
 2003 European Championship — 1st place
Tamara Radočaj, Milena Petrović, Marina Ristić, Iva Prčić, Maja Milutinović, Adrijana Knežević, Jelena Dubljević, Zorica Mitov, Dunja Prčić, Vanja Ilić, Biljana Stjepanović, Miljana Bojović. Head coach: Željko Vukićević
 2004 European Championship — 2nd place
Sanja Marjanović, Sonja Petrović, Irena Matović, Jelena Tomašević, Nina Bogićević, Dragana Gobeljić, Maja Miljković, Jelena Milovanović, Jelena Cerina, Snežana Aleksić, Milica Jovanović, Smiljana Ivanović.

References

External links
 Basketball Federation of Serbia

U16
Women's national under-16 basketball teams
Women's national under-17 basketball teams